Jiang Jiajun (born January 8, 1990) is a Chinese football player who currently plays for Chongqing Lifan in the Chinese Super League as a full-back or midfielder.

Club career
Jiang Jiajun played for the Shanghai Shenhua youth team until he was promoted to the senior team during the 2009 football league season. He went on to make his debut in a league game on September 16, 2009 against Qingdao Jonoon F.C. in a 2-1 defeat. The following season Miroslav Blažević came in as the Head manager and he decided to move Jiang Jiajun to full-back during the season, this seemed to work as he went on to a vital member of the team that ended the campaign in third. The following season saw Xi Zhikang become the new Shenhua coach and Jiang saw significantly more time in midfield where he went on to score his first senior goal on 19 April 2011 against Sydney FC in an AFC Champions League game, which ended in a 3-2 defeat. As the season progressed and despite Shenhua bringing in another coach in Dražen Besek during the season Jiang continued to gain significant playing time off the bench and scored his first league goal on September 28, 2011 in a game against Hangzhou Greentown, which Shenhua won 3-2.

At the beginning of the 2012 Chinese Super League season Jiang had a chance to return to his hometown when he joined top-tier side Jiangsu Sainty for a reported $1.1 million on the final transfer day. In February 2014, Jiang was signed for fellow Chinese Super League side Shanghai Shenxin.

On February 27, 2017, Jiang transferred to Super League side Shandong Luneng Taishan. He made his debut for the club on July 9, 2017, in a 2–0 away win against Tianjin Teda. He failed to establish himself within the club, playing just three league matches in the 2017 season.

Jiang moved to fellow Super League club Chongqing Dangdai Lifan on January 15, 2018.

International career
After an impressive 2010 league season for Shenhua, Jiang was  called up to the Chinese U-23 football team where he was re-united with his previous manager Miroslav Blažević. Jiang made his debut in a friendly on June 3, 2011 against the North Korean U-23 team in a 2-1 defeat. He was  then part of the squad that took part in the 2012 Olympic qualification process that saw China being knocked-out by the Oman U-23 team.

Career statistics
Statistics accurate as of match played 31 December 2020.

Honours

Club
Jiangsu Sainty
Chinese FA Super Cup: 2013

References

External links
 
Player profile at Shanghai Shenhua website
Player stats at sohu.com

1990 births
Living people
Chinese footballers
Footballers from Shanghai
Shanghai Port F.C. players
Shanghai Shenhua F.C. players
Jiangsu F.C. players
Shanghai Shenxin F.C. players
Shandong Taishan F.C. players
Chongqing Liangjiang Athletic F.C. players
Chinese Super League players
China League One players
China League Two players
Association football midfielders
Association football fullbacks